Liza Stara  is a village in the administrative district of Gmina Poświętne, within Białystok County, Podlaskie Voivodeship, in north-eastern Poland.

According to the 1921 census, the village was inhabited by 295 people, among whom 293 were Roman Catholic, and 2 Mosaic. At the same time, 293 inhabitants declared Polish nationality, 2 Jewish. There were 44 residential buildings in the village.

The village has a population of 200.

References

Liza Stara